Falun Township is a township in Saline County, Kansas, in the United States.

Falun Township was organized in 1871.

References

Townships in Saline County, Kansas
Townships in Kansas
1871 establishments in Kansas
Populated places established in 1871